Yevheniya Maksymovna Barvinska (1854–1913), was a Ukrainian pianist, choral conductor and singer (soprano), who promoted the music of Ukrainian composers.

Biography 
Yevheniya Lubovych was born on 20 December 1854 in Lemburg, Austrian Galicia (today Lviv, Ukraine) to Maximilian Lubovych and Elena Studynsky.

She graduated from the Teachers' Institute, Lemburg, in 1874, and studied piano privately with Karol Mikuli, the director of the Lemberg Conservatory. Her next music teacher, Fr. Ambrose, was the Ukrainian Greek Catholic priest Ambrosiy Vasilyovych Krushelnytsky, whose daughter, Solomiya Krushelnytska, was a friend and who gained international fame as a soprano. With Fr. Ambrose, Yevheniya organized and conducted the men's and women's choirs in Tarnopol (1882–1886).

Yevheniya married the educator and politician Oleksander Barvinsky (1847–1926) and they raised six children, Olga Bachynska (1874–1955), Bogdan Barvinsky (1880–1958), Roman (1881–1947), Olena Savchuk (1883–1962), Vasyl Barvinsky (1888–1963) and  Alexander Barvinsky (1889–1957). Vasyl, whose first music teacher was Yevheniya, went on to become an accomplished composer later in life.
In 1891, Yevheniya Barvinska became the conductor of the Lemburg choir of the Boyan Society through which she continued to promote the work of Ukrainian composers.

Barvinska died on 20 December 1913 in Lemburg and was buried there in the family tomb in Lychakiv Cemetery, field number three.

References 

1854 births
1913 deaths
Musicians from Lviv
20th-century Ukrainian women musicians
20th-century classical pianists
Women classical pianists
20th-century women pianists